The University Entrance Examination or Matriculation Examination is an academic examination administered to 10th standard students at all schools in Myanmar, including government schools, comprehensive schools and private boarding schools, for students seeking university admission. The test is administered at least 3 weeks after the Basic Education High School Examination. Test results determine the eligibility of high school students to pursue higher education, and their entrance into select universities and majors.

The current college admission system is being revised by the Ministry of Education. Beginning in the 2015-16 academic year, students will be able to sit for entrance exams at the universities of their choice. Further, students will be allowed to retake such exams.

Administration
The University Entrance Examination is administered by the Board of Examinations.

Each year, there are eleven question papers of equal format for Burmese states and regions. The system of eleven test papers per year was adopted in 2001-02 to prevent the leakage of some questions prior to the exam administration.

In Yangon, sales of alcohol are banned during matriculation exam administration.

Since 2015, there are only two questions papers making equal formats for the whole country (Local Question) & for those taking from overseas (Foreign Question).

Registration
Students from government high schools and comprehensive schools can register for the examinations internally by the guidelines of school teachers, although students from private boarding schools have to register for the exams externally themselves. Students who attend international English-language schools or other private schools are not eligible to sit for the matriculation exam, nor are they allowed to enroll in Burmese universities.

Students nationwide take part in these exams annually, which take place in mid-March each year (for 9 days), with results released at testing sites throughout the country in June.

Tested subjects
Students are administered a combination of 6 tests depending on their track: arts, science, and arts and sciences. The subjects offered are Burmese, English, Mathematics, Chemistry, Physics, Biology, History, Geography, Economics, and Optional Burmese. Each subject examination is 3 hours long from 9:00 AM to 12:00 PM.

Exam scores
High marks in a subject garner a distinction known as gondu. Students who achieve distinctions in four or more subjects are generally guaranteed placement in one of Myanmar's medical universities and senior engineering universities, the most selective of universities. In recent years, the combined score of students who receive 4 subject distinctions has been above 480 out of 600.  The scores of students at remote testing sites are announced via shortwave radio. Average exam scores and pass rates vary by region. In 2018, the highest pass rate was in Mandalay Region (38.17%), while the lowest pass rate was in Chin State. 

Also, the Top 10 Students, known as The Whole Burma Top 10, who scored the highest marks of all six subjects combined are announced each year corresponding to the sub-ordinate subjects taken. Out of 600 marks, the highest record-breaking marks achieved is 562 marks. As the questions’ difficulties vary for each year, there is no fixed marks in entering the Whole Burma Top 10 list. However, one can predict to entering the list if around 555 marks is achieved.

Statistics 
Below are statistics regarding the number of test takers and annual pass rate by academic year. Examinations were cancelled in the 2020-21 academic year, due to COVID-19 related school closures. Since the 2021 Myanmar coup d'état, the number of test takers has declined precipitously due to political instability, and participation of student and teachers in the nationwide civil disobedience movement.

See also
Education in Burma

References

External links
Myanmar University Entrance Examination

Education in Myanmar
School examinations
Standardized tests